Carroll Roberson (born July 17, 1955) is an evangelist, gospel singer-songwriter, and author. He is founder and president of Carroll Roberson Ministries in Ripley, Mississippi.

Biography
Roberson was born July 17, 1955, in Ripley, Mississippi. He read the Bible growing up but did not surrender his life to Christ until 1983. One year later, he was diagnosed with a cancerous growth on his throat. With no promise that he would be able to talk any more, Roberson underwent thyroid surgery and was able to sing again within three weeks. Shortly after, Roberson devoted himself to full-time ministry. After serving as minister of a Baptist church in his home town for two years, Roberson organized Carroll Roberson Ministries with a board of directors and went into full-time evangelism with his office stationed in his hometown of Ripley. Through revivals, crusades, and concerts, Roberson keeps a two-year schedule around the country.

Ministry

Music career
Roberson is well known for his Southern gospel singing and has written over 300 songs and recorded over 40 albums. He has had national success with songs like "Wilt Thou Be Made Whole", which stayed at No. 1 on the Singing News charts in 1995 for two months as well as 15 top-ten songs throughout the late 1990s. He has had five other #1 songs: "Just Go By" in 1997 and "Good Mornin' Lord", "The Way We Should Live", "As Long As There's a Mornin’" in 2021 and "Jesus Says Hello" in January 2023. Carroll has had over 20 songs reach the top ten, and has sold well over a million records. Roberson has also received numerous nominations and awards for his singing, including the Top Soloist award from Voice Magazine and Hearts Aflame Soloist of the year in 1998.

Television ministry
Roberson has a weekly 30-minute television program called This Is Carroll Roberson, which is seen in millions of homes throughout the world on Christian Television Network (CTN). The television program features straightforward Bible preaching and gospel music accompanied by his wife Donna and is filmed in various outdoor venues in the United States.  The program also appears on other stations including National Religious Broadcasters (NRB), Victory Television Network (VTN), and various regional markets.

Holy Land tours
Roberson has been hosting tours to Israel since 1993. He has also filmed several teaching DVDs in Israel. Visiting the homeland of Jesus has touched Roberson very deeply, and he regularly researches the scriptures from the Hebraic perspective.  Much of his time is devoted to Jewish studies on Jesus as the Messiah.  His trips to Israel have motivated him to focus on the life and ministry of Jesus the Messiah in the gospel accounts. Carroll believes the missing link in most religious circles is studying the scriptures from their original intent.

Family life
He lives in Ripley, Mississippi, with his wife Donna. They have two sons, Shane and Brandon.

Discography

 Genuine (1992)
 Tell It Like It Is (1993)
 Serious Business (1995)
 A Wonderful Life (1996)
 A Common Man (1997)
 His Hand in Mine (1998)
 ...It's Who you Know (1999)
 The Wonder of Christmas (2000)
 One Life to Live (2001)
 My Christmas Dream (2002)
 Heaven (2002)
 Carroll Roberson with The Jordanaires (2002)
 I’ll Sing for Him (2002)
 The Best of Carroll Roberson (2003)
 More Than a Man (2003)
 The Love of God (2003)
 Here I Am (2004)
 Happy and Free (w/ Donna Solo) (2004)
 The Masters Call (2004)
 He's Real (2005)
 Only One Messiah (2006)
 Memories of the Galilean (2006)
 Gospel Favorites (2006)
 I Walk On (2006)
 Make a Difference (2007)
 A Musical Heritage (2007)
 The Spirit of Praise (2008)
 Christmas in the Valley (2009)
 Songs of the South (2009)
 Rebel with a Cause (2009)
 Classic Gospel (2010)
 Early Years Vol.1 (2010)
 Early Years Vol.2 (2011)
 Heart and Soul (2010)
 Jesus Is Real (2011)
 Silver Edition (2012)
 A Brighter Day (2013)
 Christmas Memories (2013)
 Early Years Vol.4 (2014)
 Forever (2014)
 One Pair of Hands (2014)
 A Jesus Man (2015)
 Celebrating 30 Years (2016)
 The Best of Carroll Roberson Vol. 2 (2017)
 Treasures - Old and New (2017)
 Gospel Country Style (2018)
 Unchanging Love (2018)
 Praise the Lord (2019)
 Yesterday & Tomorrow (2020)
 Christmas Always (2020)
 The Pages of Time (2021)
 Pure Inspiration (2021)
 Underneath the Western Sky (DVD) (2022)
 Jesus Says Hello (2022)

Books authored
Roberson has authored the following books:

 The Christ: His Miracles, His Ministry, His Mission (2007) 
 How To Enjoy Jesus (2008) 
 In The Fullness of Time (2008) 
 Jesus and the 5 Senses (2010) 
 Matthew the Hebrew Gospel (2011) 
 Christmas In Those Days (2013) 
 Yeshua, the Messiah, the God-Man (2015) 
 John the Jewish Gospel (2017) 
 Luke the Lord's Gospel (2018) 
 Mark the Messiah's Gospel (2019) 
 40 Days With the Risen Christ (2019) 
 Ministry $ Money (2021) 
 Acts... and They Continued (2021)

References

External links
 Official Website
 Jesus Isreal Tours Website 

1955 births
Living people
American evangelists
American television evangelists
Christian revivalists
Christian writers
Gospel music composers
People from Ripley, Mississippi
Southern gospel performers